Martvili is a district of Georgia, in the region of Samegrelo-Zemo Svaneti. Its main town is Martvili. Martvili Municipality is located in the north-eastern part of western Georgia. It is bordered by Lentekhi in the north, Khoni and Tsageri in the east, Abasha in the south, Senaki and Chkhorotsku in the west. The southern part of the Martvili area is occupied by a lowland that rises from southwest to northeast from 60 to 170 meters. The highest place, the headwaters of Tekhuri is located at 3003 meters above sea level. To the south-west of the municipality is the Askha Mountain Range, which is rich in karst caves, waterfalls, mineral deposits and limestone. The mountains of Lebarde, Chekola and Dviri are rich in healing mineral waters.

Politics
Martvili Municipal Assembly (Georgian: მარტვილის საკრებულო) is a representative body in Martvili Municipality, consisting of 36 members which is elected every four years. The last election was held in October 2021. Tornike Janashia of Georgian Dream was elected mayor in a tight 2nd round against a candidate of the United National Movement

Administrative divisions
Mart'vili municipality is divided into one city (ქალაქი, kalaki), and 20 villages (სოფელი, sopeli):

Cities
 Martvili

Villages

 Didi Ch'q'oni
 Salkhino
 Nagvazao
 Vedidk'ari
 Abedati
 Bandza
 Gach'edili
 Tamak'oni
 Lekhaindrao
 Kurzu
 T'aleri
 Khunts'i
 Sergieti
 K'its'i
 Inchkhuri
 Nakhunao
 Gurdzemi
 Onoghia
 Najakhao
 Doshaq'e
 First Balda (:ka:პირველი ბალდა)
 Second Balda (:ka:მეორე ბალდა)
 Third Balda (:ka:მესამე ბალდა)

Twin towns – sister Municipalities

 Ardeşen, Turkey 
 Boyarka, Ukraine
 Czarnków, Poland
 Jevíčko, Czech Republic
 Odolanów, Poland

See also
 List of municipalities in Georgia (country)

References

External links
 Districts of Georgia, Statoids.com

Municipalities of Samegrelo-Zemo Svaneti